Timur Khan Ajarlu Shamlu (also spelled Teymur Khan Ajarlu'i) was the governor of Kurdistan from 1682 to 1688. Following the execution of the unpopular governor Khosrow Khan Ardalan, Shah Solayman had him replaced with Timur Khan, who became the first non-Kurdish governor of the province. Since Timur Khan was a foreigner with no connection to the province, he was eventually chased out by the locals. In 1688, he was replaced by Khan Ahmad Khan II Ardalan.

References

Sources 
 
 

Year of birth unknown
Year of death unknown
17th-century people of Safavid Iran
Safavid governors of Kurdistan